This article covers events in the year 2023 in Cuba.

Events 

2023 Cuban parliamentary election

Deaths 

 8 January – Arnie Coro, 80, Cuban radio presenter, co-founder of Radio Havana Cuba.

References 

 
2020s in Cuba
Years of the 21st century in Cuba
Cuba
Cuba